The North Dakota Fighting Hawks soccer team in Grand Forks, North Dakota competes in the Summit League.  The current Fighting Hawks soccer head coach is Chris Logan.

Head coaches

Stadium
Bronson Field

References

External links
University of North Dakota soccer website

Soccer
Soccer clubs in North Dakota
Women's soccer clubs in the United States
1999 establishments in North Dakota
Association football clubs established in 1999